Rise Above is an album by British folk music group Oysterband, released in 2002.

Track listing

All songs by Chopper, Jones, Partis, Prosser, and Telfer, unless otherwise indicated.

"The Soul's Electric" – 3:42
"Uncommercial Song" – 3:40
"If You Can't be Good" – 3:45
"Everybody's Leaving Home" – 4:27
"My Mouth" – 4:14
"Shouting about Jerusalem" – 3:30
"Blackwaterside" (Trad.) – 3:41
"Rise Above" – 3:42
"Wayfaring" – 4:30
"Bright Morning Star" (Trad.) – 3:15

Credits
John Jones – vocals, melodeon
Alan Prosser – guitars, guitar Synthesizer, bouzouki, mandolin, vocals
Chopper – cello, bass instruments, kantele
Lee Partis – drums, vocals
Ian Telfer – fiddle, concertina
Nuela Friedman – accordion
Rowan Godel – vocals
Benji Kirkpatrick – bouzouki, guitar
James O'Grady – uillean pipes, whistles
Matt Savage – keyboards

References

2002 albums
Oysterband albums